Toposa may refer to:
the Toposa people
the Toposa language